Pavel Menšík (born 15 March 1968) is a Czech rower. He competed in the men's eight event at the 1992 Summer Olympics.

References

1968 births
Living people
Czech male rowers
Olympic rowers of Czechoslovakia
Rowers at the 1992 Summer Olympics
Sportspeople from Olomouc